Olujimi Kolawole Agbaje (popularly known as Jimi Agbaje or JK; born 2 March 1957), is a Nigerian Pharmacist, and Politician. He was the 2015 PDP's Lagos State Governorship candidate, but he lost out to the eventual winner Akinwunmi Ambode. He was the 2019 Lagos State gubernatorial election candidate for PDP in the 2019 general elections.

Early life
He was born on 2 March 1957 in Lagos State to late Chief Julius Kosebinu, a banker and Mrs. Margaret Olabisi a teacher. He is the second child and first male child of five children (two female and two male siblings) including Segun Agbaje, CEO of Guaranty Trust Bank.

Business career
In 1982, Jimi Agbaje founded his own company, JAYKAY Pharmaceutical and Chemical Company Limited and was managing director until 2005, when he decided to venture into politics. A consummate professional, he was a member of the Pharmacists Council of Nigeria (1999–2006); National Secretary of the Nigerian Association of General Practice Pharmacists (NAGPP) from 1987 to 1990; National Chairman NAGPP (1990–1993) and Chairman Pharmaceutical society of Nigeria Lagos State (1994–1997). He was a member, Lagos State Task force on Fake and Adulterated Drugs (1989–1993), National Drug Formulary and Essential Drugs List (1986–1993) and Lagos Hospitals Management Board (1994–1997). Jimi Agbaje also sits on the board of other organizations including Oakwood Park Ltd, Atlantic Hall Secondary School Epe, Lagos, Jimi Agbaje Outreach (a project dedicated to helping the less fortunate) and has served as business mentor at Fate Foundation.

Political life
In a 2013 interview with The Punch Newspaper, Agbaje talked about how he began in politics: "It had to do with the Moshood Abiola/Bashir Tofa presidential election", he said. "I saw the annulment as a personal insult and an assault on the Nigerian people. This led to my first entry into what I would call activism, working with other concerned professionals" such as Prof. Pat Utomi, Dr Ayo Ighodaro, Asue Ighodalo, Billy Lawson, Oby Ezekwesili, Tola Mobolurin and Hassan Odukale. Jimi was in one form of resistance group or the other which ultimately led him to join the socio-political organization, Afenifere where he served as national treasurer.

Based on his affiliation with Afenifere, Jimi Agbaje joined the Action Congress (AC) – his first political party.  In 2007, Agbaje who had initially aspired to contest for the governor of Lagos State on the platform of the Action Congress (AC) left the party to join the Democratic People's Alliance (DPA).  He was among the 11 aspirants that turned their back to the Action Congress (AC) when it was alleged that Governor Bola Tinubu had already anointed someone else to succeed him even before the party primaries.  Widely believed to have conducted the best campaign in 2007, Agbaje contested in gubernatorial election on the Democratic People's Alliance (DPA) platform, but eventually, alongside other major contenders – Musiliu Obanikoro of PDP, Femi Pedro of Labour Party (Nigeria) – lost to Babatunde Raji Fashola of the Action Congress (AC).

He left DPA in 2011 and went on to join the ruling party, the People's Democratic Party, PDP following the de-registration of DPA by the Independent National Electoral Commission (INEC).  On 29 October 2014, he officially indicated his interest in giving the Lagos State gubernatorial elections another shot by picking up the PDP nomination form. On 8 December 2014, it was reported that he emerged as the candidate of the People's Democratic Party, PDP for the 2015 Lagos State gubernatorial election, having defeated Musiliu Obanikoro in the primary. Musiliu Obanikoro is the former Minister of State for Defence who is also a member of the opposition party, People's Democratic Party, PDP.

In October 2018, Jimi Agbaje secured the PDP's ticket to run for the office of the governor of Lagos state. He defeated Adedeji Doherty to secure the ticket. Jimi Agbaje lost to Babajide Sanwo-Olu of the All Progressives Congress, in the Lagos state gubernatorial election on 9 March 2019.

Official duties
He has held various professional positions. Among others are: 
National Secretary Nigerian Association of General Practice (1987–1990)
National Chairman of Nigerian Association of General Practice Pharmacists (1990–1993)
Chairman of the Pharmaceutical Society of Nigeria (1994–1997)
Chairman of the 1994 National Conference Planning committee of the Pharmaceutical Society of Nigeria.

Awards and fellowships
Merit Award Winner (MAW), Pharmaceutical Society of Nigeria (Lagos State chapter)
Fellow, Pharmaceutical Society of Nigeria (FPSN)
Fellow, West African Post Graduate College of Pharmacists (FPCPharm)

Personal life
He is married to Abiola Agbaje (née Bankole), a lawyer. The couple met as students at the University of Ife, now Obafemi Awolowo University and dated for eight years before getting married. They have three children; two boys and girl.

See also
Lagos State
Lagos politicians

References

External links
 

Living people
Yoruba politicians
1957 births
Obafemi Awolowo University alumni
Nigerian pharmacists
St Gregory's College, Lagos alumni
Politicians from Lagos
Yoruba businesspeople
Businesspeople in the pharmaceutical industry
Businesspeople from Lagos
20th-century Nigerian businesspeople
21st-century Nigerian businesspeople